The 2nd of May is the second LP from British/Canadian trio May Blitz. It was released in 1971 following up their previous self-titled release. This was the first May Blitz album that wasn't self produced by the band. Instead, the band hired producer John Anthony. The album saw the band introducing elements of folk and space rock into their sound.

Track listing
All songs written by Hudson/Newman/Black except where noted
Side one
For Mad Men Only - 4:15
Snakes and Ladders - 4:40
The 25th of December - 3:11
In Part - 6:07
Side two
8 Mad Grim Nits - 4:30
High Beech - 5:00
Honey Coloured Time - 4:12
Just Thinking - 6:17 (Black)

Personnel
Bass, vocals – R. Hudson
Drums, percussion – T. Newman
Guitar, twelve-string guitar, vocals – J. Black
Artwork – Tony Benyon
Photography – Chris Hopper
Producer – John Anthony
Engineer – Dave Harries

References

1971 albums